Loredana Sasso is professor of nursing at the University of Genoa, Italy. She was president of the European Federation of Nursing Regulators (FEPI) Brussels office from 2006 to 2009 during which period she worked on the creation of the Code of Ethics and Conduct for European Nursing. She is Founding President of the first Italian Sigma nursing chapter Alpha Alpha Beta based at the University of Genoa. In July 2022, she was appointed Scientific Director of the Centre of Excellence for Nursing Research and Development - Italian National Federation of Nursing Orders (CERSI - FNOPI) in Rome, Italy.

Education
Sasso is a Registered Nurse with a master's degree from the University of Genoa.

Professional life
Sasso led the establishment of the first PhD program in nursing in Italy. She is a member of the Scientific Committee of the Centre of Excellence for Nursing Scholarship in Rome, co-founder (2012) of the Italian Society of Nursing Sciences, a board member of the Foundation Insieme per Vita agli Anni and former board member (1997-2000) and Secretary General (2000-2009) of the Italian National Federation of Nursing (Federazione Nazionale Ordini Professioni Infermieristiche). She established the Italian leg of the RN4CAST study of nursing workforce, patient mortality and nurse retention. Sasso qualified as full professor in scientific disciplines general clinical and paediatric nursing sciences (Sector MED.45) and was appointed a full professor (2018) at the University of Genoa. She is a Member (2015) of the Honor Society of Nursing Sigma Theta Tau International.

Awards
Sasso is a Fellow (2016) of the American Academy of Nursing and a Fellow (2017) of the Royal College of Surgeons in Ireland Faculty of Nursing and Midwifery ad eundem.

Publications

Sasso has over 150 academic and professional articles listed on Google Scholar which have been cited over 1,000 times giving her an h-index of 21. Her three top cited articles are:

References

External links

Google Scholar
Publons

Fellows of the American Academy of Nursing
Nursing researchers
Italian nurses
Italian women nurses
1957 births
Living people